Tomáš Netík is a Czech professional ice hockey player who currently plays for the HC Slovan Bratislava in the Kontinental Hockey League.

References

External links

Living people
1982 births
Czech ice hockey forwards
HC CSKA Moscow players
HC Sparta Praha players
HC Lev Poprad players
Växjö Lakers players
Ice hockey people from Prague
Czech expatriate ice hockey players in Canada
Czech expatriate ice hockey players in Finland
Czech expatriate ice hockey players in Sweden
Czech expatriate ice hockey players in Slovakia
Czech expatriate ice hockey players in Russia
Czech expatriate sportspeople in Austria
Czech expatriate sportspeople in Croatia
Expatriate ice hockey players in Austria
Expatriate ice hockey players in Croatia